The knockout stage of the 2001 FIFA Confederations Cup began on 7 June with the semi-final round, and concluded on 10 June 2001 with the final at the International Stadium Yokohama in Yokohama. The top two teams from each group advanced to the knockout stage to compete in a single-elimination style tournament. A third place match was included and played between the two losing teams of the semi-finals.

In the knockout stage (including the final), if a match was level at the end of 90 minutes, extra time of two periods (15 minutes each) would be played. If the score was still level after extra time, the match would be decided by a penalty shoot-out. Additionally, a golden goal rule was used, according to which if the goal is scored during the extra time, the game ends immediately and the scoring team becomes the winner.

Qualified teams

Bracket

Semi-finals

Japan v Australia

France v Brazil

Third-place match

Final

References

Knockout
2001 in Japanese football
Brazil at the 2001 FIFA Confederations Cup
2001 in Australian soccer
2000–01 in French football
June 2001 sports events in Asia